Jayathirtha B. V. (born May 8th, 1977) is an Indian theater activist, production designer and filmmaker. He is known for his movies Olave Mandara, Tony, Beautiful Manasugalu, and Bell Bottom. He is also known for his work as a director and play writer.

Early life
Jayathirtha was born and brought up in Bangalore, Karnataka. A high school dropout due to financial constraints, he started working as a salesman at 17 and took up theater as a pastime. He trained at Abhinayataranga under the renowned theatre personality A. S. Murthy and later became a teacher in the same institution.

Jayathirtha won several awards for his works in theatre including the B. V. Karanth Best Stage Reviewer Award (1997) for his critical review of the play, Maranayak.

Film career

In 2007, he directed a short film called Hasivu (Hunger).  The movie won the Best Indian Short Film award at Cinerail Film Festival, Paris.

In 2011, he directed a full-fledged Kannada feature film, Olave Mandara which brought several awards including the 59th Filmfare Award (Best Director). The sub-plot of Olave Mandara is inspired by the real-life events of Dashrath Manjhi who cut a rocky hill for 22 years to build a road in memory of his wife.

Later he directed Tony (2013) which won him the Karnataka State Film Award for Best Screenplay.

Bullet Basya (2015) was a Kannada comedy film and a commercial entertainer.

Beautiful Manasugalu (2017) was another successful movie, based on the true occurrences that shocked people in 2012. The movie won Best Dialogues Award at KAFTA Times of India 2017, the only awards given to technicians in Kannada film industry.

Vanilla (2018) is a murder mystery with a message of social concerns.

Bell Bottom (2019) is a comedy crime thriller, a story of a die-hard fan of detective stories. It became the first Kannada film in 2019 to complete 100 days. It also won the second best commercial film recognition at Bangalore International Film Festival 2020. The movie has won Best Director Award in Critics Choice Film Awards 2020.

In November 2020, Jayathirtha along with four other Kannada film directors KM Chaitanya, Shashank (director), Yogaraj Bhat, and Pawan Kumar (director) came together to make a 2-hour film.

In January 2021, Bell Bottom 2, the sequel to the blockbuster Bell Bottom was announced to be directed by Jayathirtha.

Theatre Activities 

Jayathirtha has conducted more than 150 theater training programs, focusing on issues including life skills. He penned and directed 65 street plays and ten stage plays from 1996 to 2007. He organized those plays to spread social awareness among illiterates and the backward classes. Jayathirtha directed Hathim Thi, an experiment with 500 actors, at the Al-Ameen school building.

Jayathirtha has used street plays as an effective medium to convey philosophical messages, concerning social issues, imbued with the entertaining flow. His approach is to involve the audience in the flow of the plays. He scripted six stage plays and 69 street plays/shows, only on social issues.

Radio
Jayathirtha directed a 450-episode of educational radio drama for children, Chukki Chinna – Chinnara Chukki, for an NGO Education Development Center under Sarva Shikshana Abhiyana program of Govt. of India. This interactive syllabus-based radio program was recorded between 2005-2007, but it continues to play on the radio for first-standard to sixth-standard students in Karnataka government schools.

Recognition

Best Back Stage designer 1994 (Abhinaya Tharanga)
Best script writer 1996 (Abhinaya Tharanga)
Best stage reviewer 1997 (B.V.Karanth Award)
Second Best Small Story Award – from Gulbarga University (2002)
First place in small story award – from Belagali Sahithya Pratistana. (2002)
First place in small story award – from Kannada Sahithya Parishath. (2002)
First place in script writing – Street play – Pravardhini from Sahithya Sankramana (2003)
Best Indian short film Hasivu from Cinerail film festival in Paris

Filmography

Awards

References

External links 

abhinayataranga.com
 
Kannada film directors
1977 births
Living people